{{DISPLAYTITLE:C15H15NO2}}
The molecular formula C15H15NO2 (molar mass: 241.285 g/mol, exact mass: 241.1103 u) may refer to:

 Diphenylalanine
 Mefenamic acid
 Nafoxadol

Molecular formulas